Ani is a ruined Armenian medieval city in Turkey.

Ani or ANI may also refer to:

Places
 Ani, Akita, town in Japan
 Ani Rural District, in Iran
 Āņi, village in Ādaži Municipality, Latvia
 Ani, Himachal Pradesh, or Anni, a subdivision of Kullu district, Himachal Pradesh, India
 Anni Assembly constituency
 Andaman and Nicobar Islands, group of islands in the Indian Ocean
 Ani, Artsakh, or Qoşasu, a village administered by the Republic of Artsakh (1992–2020) and then Azerbaijan (2020–)
 Aniak Airport (IATA code: ANI) an airport in Alaska, US

People
Ani (given name)
Ani (surname)
Ani Lorak (born 1978), Ukrainian pop singer
Ani (pharaoh), Egyptian pharaoh
 Ani, the compiler of the ancient Egyptian Papyrus of Ani

Religion
 Ani (nun), prefix added to the name of nuns in Tibetan Buddhism
 Ani (Etruscan divinity), Etruscan god of the sky
 Ani, an Egyptian deity, consort of Anit
 Ala (odinani), also called Ani, Igbo goddess

Organisations
 Asian News International, regional news agency based in New Delhi
 Armenian National Institute, organization dedicated to the research of the Armenian Genocide
 Athletics Norfolk Island, the governing body for athletics in Norfolk Island
 Australian National Industries, defunct Australian heavy engineering company
 Autism Network International, autism advocacy organization
 Italian Nationalist Association, defunct Italian political party
 National Alliance of Independents, political party in Chile
 , the intelligence agency of Chile
 Alliance of Nonprofits for Insurance, Risk Retention Group, the nationwide insurer in the Nonprofits Insurance Alliance Group

Other uses
 Ani (bird), birds in the genus Crotophaga of the cuckoo family
 Automatic number identification, feature of a telecommunications network for automatically determining the origination telephone number
 Ancestral North Indian, in Genetics and archaeogenetics of South Asia
 ANI (file format), graphics file format used for animated cursors on the MS Windows operating system
 Ani (letter), letter of the Georgian alphabet
 Anakin Skywalker nicknamed Ani, character in the Star Wars universe
 Ani (musical), musical parody of Star Wars (2014)
 791 Ani, minor planet
 Andi language (ISO 639 code: ani), Northeast Caucasian language

See also
 Anni (disambiguation)
 Anie (disambiguation)
 Any (disambiguation)